Weston is a small hamlet near Sidmouth in East Devon, England. It is near the Donkey Sanctuary and less than a mile from the beach at Branscombe; footpaths also give access to the beach at Weston Mouth. 

Villages in Devon
East Devon District